Abbotsford Station is a  mitchell grass downs block near Stamford, Queensland, Australia. The block was balloted on the 7 November 1912 off the Stamfordham block of the home station of Katandra. It was the western portion of the block called Sloane Creek, so named after the creek that runs through the block and into the Flinders River. This block also had a sub-artesian bore (completed in 1904) which was situated centrally on the land making it the prime block in the 1912 ballot process.

The successful applicant for the block was Charles John Burdekin (Chas) Abbott (born 8 February 1878) whose family had land interests in Charters Towers at Fanning River and Ingham at Elma Grove.

See also

List of ranches and stations

References 
Fox, M.J. (1923) "The history of Queensland : its people and industries" : an historical and commercial review, descriptive and biographical facts, figures and illustrations : an epitome of progress, p. 520-521

North West Queensland
Stations (Australian agriculture)
Pastoral leases in Queensland